Ottawa—Vanier (formerly known as Ottawa East) is a federal electoral district in Ontario, Canada, that has been represented in the House of Commons of Canada since 1935. Previous to that date, it was part of the Ottawa electoral district that returned two members.

The riding generally corresponds to the wards of Beacon Hill-Cyrville, Rideau-Rockcliffe and Rideau-Vanier.

The riding became vacant because of the death of incumbent MP Mauril Bélanger on August 16, 2016. Mona Fortier was elected in the byelection to fill the seat on April 3, 2017.

The riding, with a large Franco-Ontarian population in Vanier, is one of the most solidly Liberal in the country, having elected Liberals both federally and provincially in every election since its creation. In fact, the previous electoral district which comprises most of the constituency, Russell, had been solidly Liberal since 1887. The riding is home to many civil servants.

Political geography
About 15% of the riding is in the former city of Vanier, which was amalgamated into Ottawa in 2001. Vanier has long been home to much of Ottawa's francophone population, a group that has traditionally been solidly Liberal. The riding also contains the wealthiest part of Ottawa, the former village Rockcliffe Park, which has supported both the Conservatives, and the Liberals in recent elections. The anglophone middle class neighbourhoods of Sandy Hill, containing the University of Ottawa, and New Edinburgh also tend to vote Liberal, but with significant support for the New Democratic Party. In 2011, the NDP won Sandy Hill, Lower Town, Vanier and in Overbrook. The Conservatives won in the more suburban parts of the riding like in Beacon Hill and Pineview.

Geography

In 2003, it was redefined as the part of the City of Ottawa east and north of a line running south along the Rideau Canal from the interprovincial boundary to Mann Avenue, northeast to Nicholas Street, southeast to Highway 417, and east to the abandoned Canadian Pacific Railway to the hydroelectric transmission line, north to Innes Road, northeast to Blair Road, northwest to Montreal Road, east and northeast to Regional Road 174, northeast to Green's Creek, north to the Ottawa River.

Demographics
According to the 2021 Canada Census

Ethnic groups: 60.2% White, 14.5% Black, 5.5% Indigenous, 5.2% Arab, 3.6% South Asian, 2.8% Chinese, 1.9% Latin American, 1.6% Filipino, 1.5% West Asian

Languages: 47.1% English, 23.5% French, 4.2% Arabic, 1.9% Spanish, 1.3% Mandarin

Religions: 53.8% Christian (33.5% Catholic, 3.1% Anglican, 2.0% United Church, 1.8% Christian Orthodox, 1.1% Pentecostal, 12.3% Other), 9.5% Muslim, 32.8% None

Median income: $42,400 (2020)

Average income: $57,600 (2020)

History

The federal riding was created as "Ottawa East" in 1933 from parts of Ottawa and Russell ridings.

It initially consisted of, in the city of Ottawa, Rideau, Ottawa, By, St. Georges wards and the northeast part of Riverdale Ward, the town of Eastview, and the village of Rockcliffe Park.

In 1947, it was redefined to exclude the town of Eastview. In 1952, it was redefined to consist of the village of Rockcliffe Park, and the eastern parts of the city of Ottawa.  In 1966, it was redefined to include the City of Eastview and exclude the village of Rockcliffe Park.

The name of the electoral district was changed in 1973 to "Ottawa—Vanier".

In 1976, it was redefined to consist of the City of Vanier, and the eastern parts of the city of Ottawa. In 1987, it was redefined to consist of the City of Vanier, the eastern part of the city of Ottawa, part of the city of Gloucester and the Village of Rockcliffe Park. In 1996, the Ottawa and Gloucester parts of the riding were redefined.

In 2003, it was given its current boundaries that are described above.

Following the Canadian federal electoral redistribution, 2012, the riding gained the neighbourhood of Beacon Hill South from Ottawa—Orléans.

Members of Parliament

This riding has elected the following Members of Parliament:

Election results

Ottawa—Vanier

	

|align="left" colspan=2|Liberal hold
|align="right"|Swing
|align="right"|+2.64
|align="right"|
|align="right"|

|align="left" colspan=2|Liberal hold
|align="right"|Swing
|align="right"| -5.67
|align="right"|
				

Note: Conservative vote is compared to the total of the Canadian Alliance vote and Progressive Conservative vote in 2000 election.

Note: Canadian Alliance vote is compared to the Reform vote in 1997 election.

Ottawa East

			

Note: NDP vote is compared to CCF vote in 1958 election. Communist vote is compared to Labour-Progressive vote in 1958 election.
			

			

					

					
Note: Progressive Conservative vote is compared to "National Government" vote in 1940 election.

See also
 List of Canadian federal electoral districts
 Past Canadian electoral districts

References

Notes

External links
 Riding history 1933-1973 from the Library of Parliament
 Riding history from 1973-present from the Library of Parliament
 Map of the Riding (pdf)
 Politwitter
 Project Democracy
 Pundits Guide
 StatsCan District Profile

Federal electoral districts of Ottawa
Ontario federal electoral districts
1933 establishments in Ontario